Jayden Reed (born April 28, 2000) is an American football wide receiver and return specialist for the Michigan State Spartans. He previously played at Western Michigan.

Early life and high school career
Reed grew up in Aurora, Illinois. He initially attended Metea Valley High School, where he played football with Michigan State teammate Payton Thorne. As a junior, he caught 23 passes for 403 yards and four touchdowns. Along with Thorne, he transferred to Naperville Central High School before the beginning of his senior year.

College career

Western Michigan 
Reed began his collegiate career at Western Michigan. He was named a freshman All-American by the Football Writers Association of America after catching 56 passes for 797 yards and eight touchdowns. After the season, Reed announced that he would be leaving the program.

Michigan State 
Reed ultimately chose to transfer to Michigan State.

Reed sat out and redshirted his first season at Michigan State due to NCAA transfer rules. As a redshirt sophomore, he started all seven of Michigan State's games in the team's COVID-19-shortened 2020 season and had a team-high 33 receptions for 407 yards and three touchdowns. Reed also returned 16 kickoffs for 329 yards and two punts for 14 yards and was named honorable mention All-Big Ten Conference as a return specialist. He was named the Big Ten Special Teams Player of the Week for Week 4 of his redshirt junior season after returning a punt 62 yards for a touchdown and two kickoffs for 69 yards in a 23-20 overtime win against Nebraska.

Reed has been named to the Maxwell Award watch list for the upcoming 2022 season.

References

External links
Western Michigan Broncos bio
Michigan State Spartans bio

Living people
Players of American football from Illinois
American football wide receivers
Michigan State Spartans football players
Western Michigan Broncos football players
2000 births
Sportspeople from Naperville, Illinois
All-American college football players